Ahmed Said (29 August 1925 – 4 June 2018) was an Egyptian radio broadcaster. He was the first director and main announcer for Sawt al-Arab from its founding in 1953 until 1967. He was known for calling for Arab unity and the liberation of Palestine from “the sea to the (Jordan) river” and claims to have written the station's famous tag line of "Sawt al-Arab, calling to the Arab nation from the heart of Cairo." He died on 4 June 2018, aged 92.

References

1925 births
2018 deaths
Egyptian radio presenters
Mass media people from Cairo